Ana Lucía Reis (born July 17, 1970 in Porvenir) is a Bolivian politician, Mayor of Cobija, and owner of an ecological hotel. She is affiliated with the Movement for Socialism (MAS). She started her career as a Congressional deputy representing the Revolutionary Nationalist Movement, elected in 2002, but changed to the MAS in 2005 and was re-elected for this party. She won the 2010 mayoral election in Cobija with 53.7% of the vote, the highest vote for any of the mayors in the main cities.

References

1970 births
Living people
People from Nicolás Suárez Province
Revolutionary Nationalist Movement politicians
Movement for Socialism (Bolivia) politicians
Mayors of places in Bolivia
21st-century Bolivian politicians
21st-century Bolivian women politicians